Bernhard Schwidewski (1885–1966) was a German art director.

Selected filmography
 The Tragedy of a Great (1920)
 Struggle for the Soil (1925)
 The Dice Game of Life (1925)
 Lightning (1925)
 Gretchen Schubert (1926)
 My Friend the Chauffeur (1926)
 Tragedy at the Royal Circus (1928)
 The Beggar Student (1931)
 The Woman They Talk About (1931)
 Frisians in Peril (1935)

References

Bibliography
 Hardt, Ursula. From Caligari to California: Erich Pommer's life in the International Film Wars. Berghahn Books, 1996.

External links

1885 births
1966 deaths
German art directors
Film people from Berlin